Janis Mackey Frayer (born May 27, 1970) is a Canadian journalist and a correspondent with NBC News based in Beijing, China.  Previously she worked in Canada with CTV as its Asia Bureau Chief. She was the network's Middle East Bureau Chief in Jerusalem, from 2003 to 2009 and South Asia Bureau Chief in New Delhi, India from 2009 to 2013.

Mackey Frayer holds a master's degree in International Relations from the University of Cambridge. She studied international relations and French at the University of Toronto.

Her career began at CFOS Radio in Owen Sound, Ontario, and at age 19 she worked at YTV. She was later a financial news anchor with BNN and wrote a regular business column for The Globe and Mail newspaper.

She is married to photojournalist Kevin Frayer and they have one son.

Awards and honours
Janis Mackey Frayer was awarded the Canadian Screen Award for Best Reportage for her coverage of the 2014 Israel–Gaza conflict, the United Nations/UNDPI Gold Medal at the 2010 New York Festivals and also won World Gold in the category of Human Interest. She then served as a member of the NYF Grand Jury from 2011 to 2014. She has earned two Gemini Award nominations for Best Reportage and two RTNDA Awards for News.

References

External links 
 
 
 NBC News Correspondent Reunite With Son After Coronavirus Coverage - NBC Nightly News

1970 births
Living people
Canadian expatriates in China
Canadian expatriates in India
Canadian expatriates in the United Kingdom
Canadian television reporters and correspondents
University of Toronto alumni
American women journalists
Canadian women television journalists
CTV Television Network people
Canadian Screen Award winning journalists
21st-century American women